Surya Bahadur Thapa (March 21, 1928 – April 15, 2015) was a Nepali politician and a five-time Prime Minister of Nepal. He served under three different kings in a political career lasting more than 50 years.

Thapa was selected as a member of advisory council in 1958 and was elected as the chairperson. Later he was appointed to the Upper house in 1959 and was appointed to the chair of the Council of Ministers from 1963 to 1964.  He went on to serve four further terms: 1965–69, 1979–83, 1997–98, and again in 2003 before leaving his Rastriya Prajatantra Party in November 2004.

Surya Bahadur Thapa was the first Prime Minister under the Panchayat System of Nepal. In his later years, he was the leader of Rastriya Janashakti Party. He died on 15 April 2015 from respiratory failure while undergoing surgery.

Biography 

Surya Bahadur Thapa was born on March 21, 1928, in the village of Muga in Dhankuta district.  He began his political career in the underground student movement in 1950. In November 1958, he was selected to the national assembly as an independent, and became Chairman of the Advisory Council. In 1959, Thapa was elected to the Upper House. He was appointed Minister of Agriculture, Forest and Industry under the newly formed Panchayat system. Subsequently, he served as Member of National Legislature and Minister of Finance and Economic Affairs.

First term 
Despite not even standing for election in 1963, Thapa was nominated to the National Panchyat by King Mahendra and was appointed chair of the Council of Ministers and Minister of Finance, Law, Justice and General Administration. During this period he was instrumental in abolishing "Land-Birta-System" and set strategies to promote land reform by consolidating tenancy rights of the tenants. Thapa was responsible for "Muluki-Ain", through which he attempted to eradicate the practice of an untouchable caste and promote women's suffrage, among other social activism.

Second term 
In 1966, Thapa was again appointed Prime Minister under the modified Constitution of Nepal. He was responsible for expanding the coverage of the constitution of 1962, and promulgated its second amendment to make it "people oriented".  In 1967, Thapa tendered his resignation, saying that the long tenure of one prime minister was undemocratic in the development of the country.

Third term 
In October 1972, Thapa was arrested and imprisoned in Nakhhu Jail when he demanded political reform in his Itum-Bahal public address. The speech promoted a 13-point resolution, which included democratic changes in the Constitution and restoring rights to the people with democratic elections. He went on a 21-day hunger strike in March 1974, demanding major political reform in the country.

After pro-democracy demonstrations in 1979, Nepali voters chose to uphold the Panchayat system in a referendum in 1980, and King Birendra appointed Thapa Prime Minister on June 1, 1980. The referendum was accompanied by a general amnesty for political prisoners.

Thapa maintained the position through a parliamentary election in 1981.  After serving a further two years, he resigned in 1983 when his government lost a no confidence vote.

Between 1983 and 1990, Thapa often spoke on politics, criticizing those who were against democratic reform and urging the strengthening of political and economic development processes in the country. Thapa's statements were quoted in many leading national newspapers. There was an attempt to assassinate one of the editors (Padam Thakurathi) who published Thapa's views.  An attempt was made to assassinate Thapa himself while he was traveling through Jhallari, West Nepal.

Fourth term 
In 1990, the People's Movement led to the institution of a constitutional democracy system of government with multiple political parties. Thapa started the Rastriya Prajantra Party (RPP) and was elected chairman of the party four years later. The party did not win the 1991 or 1994 elections, but after two successive governments suffered no-confidence motions within a year, King Birendra asked Thapa to form a new coalition government on October 7, 1997. The next February, Thapa's government survived a no-confidence vote, ending the year-long constitutional crisis.  Thapa then conceded the prime ministership to his coalition partner, Girija Prasad Koirala of the Nepali Congress.

Fifth and Final term 
In 2002, Thapa presided over the Third National Convention of RPP in Pokhara which paved the way for new leadership within the RPP Party.  In June 2003, he was appointed Prime Minister of Nepal for the sixth time. During this tenure as prime Minister, he also held the Defense Minister position.   Under Thapa, the government offered women special reservations and quotas in government for the first time, via the Public Service Commission. Special quotas were also provided to the under-privileged Dalits and Janajatis for higher education.

Under Thapa's tenure, the government offered the Maoists a 75-point socio-economic and political reform package during peace talks.  However, the peace talks failed. To counter the persistent bloody attacks on the police, army, and civilians, Thapa set up the Unified Command.  Under the program, the police, army, and armed security functioned as a cohesive team to combat terrorism in the country. Thapa secured arms, military hardware, and aircraft for the army from donor countries (India, USA, and Great Britain) as military aid. When the country was reeling under civil war, he remained adamant that no commissions should be made on arms, unlike his predecessors. All arms procured during this period were under grant aid.

In November 2003, Thapa as the Chairman of the SAARC, urged the Indian Prime Minister Atal Bihari Vajpayee and Pakistani President Zafarullah Khan Jamali to participate in the SAARC Summit in Islamabad. His active participation and persuasion as the SAARC Chairman brought both these nuclear countries to table at the summit.  Thapa also became the first Nepali Prime Minister to make an official visit to the Druk Kingdom of Bhutan. Several bilateral agreements were initiated with the SAARC countries during this historic visit.

Resignation 
On May 7, 2004, Thapa resigned after to a street protest staged by the five party alliance. In his resignation speech to the nation, he insisted that he would continue to play an active role to forge national consensus. Thapa lead a caretaker government for 25 days as the parties failed to nominate a consensual individual to the post of the prime minister. He officially stepped down on June 2.

In August 2004, Thapa made his first public statement after his resignation, asking the party leadership to call for a Special General Convention. The Special General Convention was never called, however. Thapa then proposed the Broader National Political Conference amongst all democratic political parties in order to create an alternative democratic force in the country against the new Maoist government.

Rastriya Janshakti Party emerged from a split in the Rastriya Prajatantra Party, as Thapa left RPP on November 4, 2004. On November 19, 2004, Thapa and his followers opened a contact office in Balutwar, Kathmandu, to organise a "broad political conference" and coordinate the construction of a new party. The RJP was founded on March 13, 2005. The political conference was, however, postponed due to the imposition of emergency rule by King Gyanendra on February 1, 2005.

RJP had expressed differences with King Gyanendra after the February 1, 2005, coup on political appointments in the local administrations. RJP accused the King of eliminating the forces working for constitutional monarchy, through his political actions. At the time, RJP tried to profile itself as a centrist party, in between positions advocating direct monarchical rule and republic.  During the Loktantra Andolan, the RJP suggested that the King Gyanendra would initiate talks with constitutional forces. When the King was stripped of his political powers by the interim parliament, RJP did not object, and in November 2006, the Prajatantrik Nepal Party led by Keshar Bahadur Bista merged into RJP.

Ahead of the Constituent Assembly election, RJP proposed having a mixed election system, with 75 district representatives and 230 members elected through proportional representation. The party also proposed creating an "Ethnic Assembly" as the upper house of parliament.

Later years and death 

On February 6, 2008, Thapa initiated unity talks with the leader of RPP, Pashupati Shamsher Jang Bahadur Rana. In a joint press conference, both Thapa and Rana agreed to unite RJP-RPP as one single party.  On March 6, he declared that his party was not monarchist, but would accept the verdict of the voters. RJP MPs had previously boycotted a vote in the interim parliament on making Nepal a republic. Thapa had dubbed the vote "an attack on the fundamental norms of democracy".

Thapa died on April 15, 2015, aged 87 in Delhi, India, from respiratory failure while undergoing surgery.  He is survived by three daughters and a son, Sunil Bahadur Thapa, a former minister of commerce and supply.

Awards

National 
 Nepal Shreepada, I Class
 Order of Tri Shakti Patta (Three Divine Powers), Member First Class (Jyotirmaya-Subikhyat-Tri-Shakti-Patta), 1963
 Order of Gorkha Dakshina Bahu (Gurkha Right Hand), Member First Class (Suprasidha-Prabala-Gorkha-Dakshina-Bahu), 1965
 Vishesh Sewa Padak
 Daibi-Prakob Piditoddar Padak, 1968
 Subha-Rajya-Vishek Padak, 1975
 Order of Om Rama Patta 1980
 Birendra-Aishwarya Sewa Padak, 2002

International 
 Order of Merit of the Federal Republic of Germany
 National Order of Merit (France)

References

External links 

1928 births
2015 deaths
Nepalese Hindus
Prime ministers of Nepal
Finance ministers of Nepal
University of Allahabad alumni
Rastriya Prajatantra Party politicians
Government ministers of Nepal
Members of the National Assembly (Nepal)
Members of the Order of Tri Shakti Patta, First Class
Members of the Order of Gorkha Dakshina Bahu, First Class
People from Dhankuta District
Recipients of the Order of Merit of the Federal Republic of Germany
Burials at sea
Members of the Rastriya Panchayat
Nepal MPs 1994–1999
Nepal MPs 1999–2002
People of the Nepalese Civil War
20th-century prime ministers of Nepal
21st-century prime ministers of Nepal
Members of the 2nd Nepalese Constituent Assembly